A Cool Head is Ian Rankin's entry in Quick Reads 2009.

Plot summary 
Gravy works in a graveyard. One day his friend turns up in a car he doesn't recognise. His friend has a bullet in his chest. Gravy is asked to hide the gun and the body. In the back of the car is blood, and a bag full of money. Soon Gravy is caught up in a robbery gone wrong and is pursued by some desperate and mysterious men as well as the police.

2009 British novels
Novels by Ian Rankin
Orion Books books